The 2015–16 Delaware State Hornets men's basketball team represented Delaware State University during the 2015–16 NCAA Division I men's basketball season. The Hornets, led by second year head coach Keith Walker, played their home games at Memorial Hall and were members of the Mid-Eastern Athletic Conference. They finished the season 7–25, 5–11 record in MEAC play to finish in a tie for 12th place. They lost to Savannah State in the first round of the MEAC tournament.

Roster

Schedule

|-
!colspan=9 style="background:#; color:white;"| Regular season

|-
!colspan=9 style="background:#; color:white;"| MEAC tournament

References

Delaware State Hornets men's basketball seasons
Delaware State
Horn
Horn